Louis Theodor Weichardt (21 May 1894 – 26 October 1985) was a South African political leader, born in Paarl of German extraction, who founded the Greyshirts, a Nazi organization.

In Cape Town, on 26 October 1933, he founded the South African Christian National Socialist Spider Movement with a paramilitary section (modeled on Nazi Germany's brown-shirted Sturmabteilung) called the Gryshemde or Grayshirts. He was interned during World War II, and afterward worked with Oswald Pirow's New Order. Disbanding his party in 1948, Weichardt gave his allegiance to Daniel François Malan's National Party. He became senator from Natal Province from 1956 to 1970.

References
 Biographical Dictionary of the Extreme Right Since 1890 edited by Philip Rees (1991)
 Fascism: Comparison and Definition by	Stanley G. Payne (University of Wisconsin–Madison Press, 1980)
 The South African Opposition 1939-1945 by Michael Roberts & A.E.G. Trollip (Cape Town, 1947)

External links
 "Vote for Louis Weichardt"  on the Simon Wiesenthal Center website
 Louis Weichardt; Greyshirt leader, 1937 newspaper photo on the Simon Wiesenthal Center website

1894 births
1985 deaths
People from Paarl
Afrikaner people
South African collaborators with Nazi Germany
South African prisoners and detainees
National Party (South Africa) politicians
Members of the Senate of South Africa

Prisoners and detainees of South Africa